André Charles Collini (18 November 1921 – 10 November 2003) was a French Roman Catholic priest. He served as Bishop of Ajaccio from 1966 to 1972 and as Archbishop of Toulouse from 1978 to 1996.

Early life
Collini was born in Tunis, Tunisia (then a French protectorate) to a family of European settlers (Pieds-Noirs). His father was a court clerk. In 1943, while Collini was a student at the Seminary of Tunisia, he joined the French army. Collini was ordained in 1947 after the Second World War.

Career
On 7 September 1962 Collini was named honorary bishop of Zephirium and bishop coadjutor of the Bishop of Ajaccio Jean-Baptiste Llosa. Collini was ordained Bishop on 7 October 1962, at the Saint Louis Cathedral in Carthage, Tunisia. At 41, he was the youngest French bishop at the time. Four days later, he took part in the Second Vatican Council (1962-1965). He was appointed Bishop of Ajaccio on 26 July 1966.

After he was appointed coadjutor of the Archbishop of Toulouse Jean Guyot on 21 December 1972, Collini became Archbishop of Toulouse on 16 November 1978.

Views
Bishop Collini was notable for his involvement in ecumenism. He took progressive positions on the ordination of married men and condom use.

Death
In December 1996, Collini resigned as archbishop and retired to Notre-Dame de la Paix in Lagardelle-sur-Lèze. He died in Lourdes on 10 November 2003. He was buried in the southern vault of the choir at the Saint-Étienne cathedral of Toulouse.

Honors

 Knight of the Legion of Honour. 
 Médaille Militaire 
 Croix de Guerre 1939–1945.

References

1921 births
2003 deaths
Archbishops of Toulouse
Bishops of Ajaccio
20th-century Roman Catholic titular bishops
20th-century Roman Catholic bishops in France
People from Tunis
French Army chaplains
Chevaliers of the Légion d'honneur
Recipients of the Croix de Guerre 1939–1945 (France)